Dumfriesshire by-election may refer to one of several by-elections held for the British House of Commons constituency of Dumfriesshire in Scotland, including:

1935 Dumfriesshire by-election
1963 Dumfriesshire by-election

See also
Dumfriesshire (UK Parliament constituency)